Jill Cunniff (born August 17, 1966) is an American musician and artist, best known as the lead singer of the band Luscious Jackson. Cunniff was born and raised in New York City and attended Fiorello H. LaGuardia High School where she studied visual arts. She graduated from the University of California, Berkeley.  After returning to New York in 1991, she formed Luscious Jackson with friend Gabby Glaser. Cunniff plays bass, sings lead vocals, and has been the chief songwriter of the band.

Cunniff appeared in a 1996 episode of the Adult Swim series Space Ghost Coast to Coast as herself. That same year, she provided the voice of Laura for the English localization of the Sega Saturn game Enemy Zero.

Cunniff joined bandmate Vivian Trimble under the name Kostars and recorded the album Klassics with a "K", released in 1996. In 2002, she formed a house music group named the Cooler Kids. Cunniff released a solo album, City Beach, in early 2007.

Cunniff is also a painter. She lives in Brooklyn with her husband and 2 children.

References

1966 births
Living people
21st-century American singers
21st-century American composers
20th-century American singers
20th-century American musicians
Luscious Jackson members
Singers from New York City
American women singer-songwriters
American rock bass guitarists
Women bass guitarists
Feminist musicians
Guitarists from New York City
20th-century American women singers
20th-century American guitarists
21st-century American women singers
21st-century women composers
20th-century American women guitarists
Cooler Kids members
Kostars members
Singer-songwriters from New York (state)